Epityches is a monotypic genus of clearwing (ithomiine) butterflies, named by d'Almeida in 1938. They are in the brush-footed butterfly family, Nymphalidae. Its sole species is Epityches eupompe.

References 

Ithomiini
Nymphalidae of South America
Monotypic butterfly genera
Nymphalidae genera